The List is a digital guide to arts and entertainment in the United Kingdom.

The company's activities include events data gathering, content syndication, and running a network of websites carrying listings and editorial, covering film, eating and drinking, music, theatre, visual art, dance, kids and family, clubs and the Edinburgh Festivals. Originally launched in 1985 as a fortnightly arts and entertainment magazine covering Edinburgh and Glasgow, The List magazine switched in 2014 to publishing every two months throughout the year, and weekly during the Edinburgh Festivals in August.

History

The List is an independent limited company and was founded in October 1985 by Robin Hodge (publisher) and Nigel Billen (founding editor). The first editors were Nigel Billen and Sarah Hemming.

In 2007 the company launched its listings website.

In June 2016, The Sunday Times Scotland launched a fortnightly events guide pullout section, produced in collaboration with The List.

Activities

The List supplies UK-wide listings information to a number of organisations and publications, including Visit Hull and East Yorkshire, DC Thomson and Glasgow City Marketing Bureau. The List′s website also allows event promoters to submit new event listings and enhance existing ones with more information, links and media content.

The List is a member of the group of organisations who developed an International Venue and Event Standard (IVES). A now dormant project.

The List is a member of the Creative Industries Federation.

Publications

The List publishes several printed guides throughout the year. These include the Edinburgh Festival Guide, the Eating & Drinking Guide, which includes reviews of over 900 restaurants, cafes and bars in Glasgow and Edinburgh, and the annual Guide to Scotland's Festivals.

The List also publishes a series of guides under the Larder imprint. Since 2009, it has published two national editions and more than twenty regional editions. The Larder provides comprehensive information and articles about producers and sources for local food and drink across Scotland.

Online activity

As the print magazine came under increasing competition in the early 2000s, listings were increasingly moved to its website. The network of sites includes minisites dedicated to Film, Food & Drink and Edinburgh Festivals.

Awards

Best Online Presence, PPA Scotland Awards 2003, 2008, 2009, 2013, 2015
Best Digital Strategy, PPA Scotland Awards 2011
Allen Wright Award, Fringe Society 2011, 2012, 2016

Notable regular contributors (past and present)

Phil Kay – Stand-up comedian
David Keenan – Author, critic and musician
Lauren Mayberry – Lead singer of Chvrches
Penny Thomson – Director of the Edinburgh International Film Festival

See also
 List of magazines published in Scotland

References

External links
 

1985 establishments in Scotland
Entertainment magazines published in the United Kingdom
Culture in Edinburgh
Culture in Glasgow
Culture in Dundee
Listings magazines
Magazines established in 1985
Magazines published in Scotland
Mass media in Edinburgh